Nick & You is a two-hour children's block that airs on the Vietnamese TV channel, You TV (Hanoicab 2). The block first launched on September 15, 2016. The block features programming from the children's TV channel, Nickelodeon dubbed into Vietnamese. On January 1, 2023, the block was closed and replaced by Kids & You.

Programming

Swindle (Kẻ lừa đảo)
Bucket & Skinner's Epic Adventures (Cuộc phiêu lưu của Bucket và Skinner)
The Adventures of Jimmy Neutron: Boy Genius (Thế giới thần kỳ của Jimmy)
The Penguins of Madagascar (Những chú chim cánh cụt đến từ Madagascar)
The Thundermans (Siêu nhân sấm sét)
Dora the Explorer (Thám hiểm cùng Dora)
Victorious (Tỏa Sáng Cùng Tori)
PAW Patrol (Biệt Đội Thú Cưng)
WITS Academy (Học viện phù thủy)
The Legend of Korra (Huyền thoại Korra)
SpongeBob SquarePants (Chú bọt biển tinh nghịch)
Nicky, Ricky, Dicky & Dawn (Nicky, Ricky, Dicky, và Dawn)
Wonder Pets! (Thú Nuôi Diệu Kỳ)
100 Things to Do Before High SchoolThe Loud House (Ngôi nhà náo nhiệt)Big Time Rush Top Wing (Biệt đội Top Wing)Rise of the Teenage Mutant Ninja Turtles (Ninja rùa nổi dậy)Teenage Mutant Ninja TurtlesBella and the BulldogsBig Time Movie (Bộ phim lớn đầu đời)Dora and Friends (Dora và những người bạn: Cuộc phiêu lưu trong thành phố)Yo Soy FrankyShimmer and Shine (Shimmer và Shine)Rusty Rivets (Rusty, Nhà sáng chế tí hon)Talia in the Kitchen (Talia vào bếp)Game Shakers (Những trò chơi tuyệt đỉnh)Max & Shred (Max và Shred)Knight SquadHunter StreetHenry Danger (Siêu anh hùng Henry)Harvey Beaks (Harvey Beaks và những người bạn)iCarly (Cô Bé Internet Carly)I Am Frankie (Tôi Là Frankie)Go, Diego, Go! (Diego hoàng tử rừng xanh)Supah Ninjas (Biệt đội ninja)Bubble Guppies (Những chú cá bảy màu bong bóng)Catscratch (Ba Chú mèo)Team Umizoomi (Biệt đội Umizoomi)The Haunted Hathaways (Ngôi nhà kỳ bí)The Fairly OddParents (Những bà tiên kỳ quặc)T.U.F.F. Puppy (Chú cún TUFF)Back at the Barnyard (Nông trại nổi loạn)Monsters vs. Aliens (Quái vật ác chiến người ngoài hành tinh)Blaze and the Monster Machines (Blaze và những chiếc xe tải Quái vật)Marvin Marvin (Người ngoài hành tinh Marvin)Sam & Cat (Sam và Cat)Bunsen Is a Beast (Quái vật tí hon Bunsen)Breadwinners (Bộ đôi giao bánh mì)Zoey 101'' (Zoey và năm học mới)

References

External links

YouTV website

Nickelodeon
Television networks in Vietnam
2016 establishments in Vietnam